Aleksander Tamm (5 March 1868 Tallinn – 3 August 1950 Tallinn) was an Estonian politician. He was a member of II Riigikogu.

References

1868 births
1950 deaths
Politicians from Tallinn
People from Kreis Harrien
National Liberal Party (Estonia) politicians
Members of the Vaps Movement
Members of the Riigikogu, 1923–1926